Hugh Massey Clark (21 January 1886 – 21 January 1956), of New York City, was a noted philatelist and publisher. He was married to Theresa Maria Clark.

Philatelic editing
Hugh Clark joined the Scott Stamp and Coin Company in 1912 and served in various capacities at the company, including being appointed as manager in 1914. Theresa Maria Clark (née Scheidemantel) also worked as an editor at the firm, and they eventually married. In 1935 he and his wife Theresa co-edited the Scott Standard Postage Stamp Catalogue.

In 1938 Hugh and Theresa purchased the firm, sold off the retail postage stamp and coin sales portions of the business, and renamed it Scott Publications. They both continued their work at Scott until they finally sold the firm to Gordon R. Harmer in 1946.

Philatelic activity
Hugh Clark was active in promoting stamp collecting through various media, including radio, newspapers, advertising, and lending frames to philatelists for use at philatelic exhibitions.

Clark was active in supporting or founding a number of philatelic organizations. He was president of the American Stamp Dealers Association for a number of years, was very active in supporting philatelic exhibitions in association with the Association for Stamp Exhibitions, and was a founding member of the Philatelic Foundation.

Honors and awards
In 1947 Hugh Clark signed the Roll of Distinguished Philatelists, and, he was named to the American Philatelic Society Hall of Fame in 1957.

Legacy
When the Clarks sold Scott Publications, they donated its famous reference collection, originally constructed by John Nicholas Luff, to the Philatelic Foundation.

See also
 Stamp collecting
 Philatelic literature

References

External links
 APS Hall of Fame – Hugh Massey Clark

1886 births
1956 deaths
Philatelic literature
American philatelists
Businesspeople from New York City
Signatories to the Roll of Distinguished Philatelists
American Philatelic Society
20th-century American businesspeople